This article lists the presidents of Honduras, since the country declared its independence from Spain on 15 September 1821.

Heads of state of Honduras within the Federal Republic of Central America (1821–1839) 

On 1 July 1823 Honduras, along with Guatemala, El Salvador, Nicaragua and Costa Rica, declared its independence from the First Mexican Empire to form the short lived Federal Republic of Central America, also known as United Provinces of Central America. Honduras remained as a member state until it decided to separate in 1838. The entire union dissolved in civil war between 5 November 1838, when Nicaragua separated from the federation, and about 1840.

Presidents of independent Honduras (1839–present) 
  
Honduras declared itself independent on 15 November 1838, and a constitution was formally adopted in January 1839. After a period of instability, conservative General Francisco Ferrera became the first elected president of the country for a two-year term, but then extended his de facto control of the nation for the next five years.

Most presidents after 1900 represent one of the two dominant political parties, the Liberal Party of Honduras (PLH) and the National Party of Honduras (PNH).

The most recent general election was held on 28 November 2021, with Xiomara Castro of Libre elected president, taking office on 27 January 2022.

See also

 President of Honduras
 List of governors of Spanish Honduras
 History of Honduras

References

List
Honduras
Presidents